2020 is the 9th year in the history of RXF, the largest mixed martial arts promotion based in Romania. Because of the COVID-19 pandemic in Romania, the promotion went on hiatus. It resumed holding events after the middle of the year.

List of events

Brave CF 36 (Cancelled)

Brave CF 36: Brewin vs. Patterson was a planned mixed martial arts event originally to take place on April 13, 2020 in Bucharest, Romania. Due to the COVID-19 pandemic, the event was eventually postponed.

Fight card

Brave CF 35

Brave CF 35: Fakhreddine vs. Cortese was a mixed martial arts event that took place on July 20, 2020 at the Berăria H in Bucharest, Romania.

Results

Brave CF 36

Brave CF 35: Todd vs. Amílcar was a mixed martial arts event that took place on July 27, 2020 at the Berăria H in Bucharest, Romania.

Results

See also
 2020 in UFC
 2020 in Bellator MMA
 2020 in ONE Championship
 2020 in Absolute Championship Akhmat
 2020 in Konfrontacja Sztuk Walki
 2020 in Romanian kickboxing

References

External links
RXF
 

2020 in mixed martial arts
Real Xtreme Fighting events